Rinorea welwitschii is a plant species in the genus Rinorea found in Africa.

The pyranoisoflavone alpinumisoflavone can be found in the bark of R. welwitschii.

References

External links
 Rinorea welwitschii at liberianfaunaflora.org

welwitschii